Veaceslav Țâbuleac is a journalist from the Republic of Moldova. Veaceslav Țâbuleac and Valeriu Saharneanu were the founders of the radio station Vocea Basarabiei and Euronova Media Group.

Awards 
 Veaceslav Tibuleac received "Ordinul de Onoare" (Order of Honor) for substantial contribution to freedom of speech in Moldova, as stated in Mihai Ghimpu's decree.

See also 
 Vocea Basarabiei

References

External links 
 Veaceslav Ţibuleac, director postului de radio “Vocea Basarabiei:” “În R.Moldova există doar o singură libertate – libertatea presei ruseşti şi a canalelor ruseşti”
 Radio station “Vocea Basarabiei” claims it is intimidated by Communist government again
 “Vocea Basarabiei” se aude şi în Transnistria

Living people
Moldovan journalists
Male journalists
Writers from Chișinău
Euronova Media Group
Year of birth missing (living people)